A quill is a writing tool made from the wing feather of a large bird.

Quill may also refer to:

Computer software
Quill, a word processor developed by Psion
Quill (software), a 1982 suite of tools for literacy development
QUILL, a programming language used in Quintiq software
The Quill Adventure System, a 1983 computer program to write adventure games
Quill, an automated narrative generator from Narrative Science
Oculus Quill, a painting and animation software for virtual reality
Quill, a messaging service/chat app purchased by Twitter in December 2019 and shut down in December 2021.

Films
Quill (film), a 2004 Japanese movie
Quills (film), a 2000 English movie

Mechanical parts
Quill (bicycle part), a component that connects handlebars to the steerer tube of the fork
Quill drive, a mechanism to connect drive shafts together so they need not be oriented in the same direction
The protruding movable shaft in the tailstock of a lathe
The non-rotating shaft that houses the spindle in a pillar drill

Music
Quill (band), a US band that played at the Woodstock festival
 Quill (album)
The Quill (band), a Swedish stoner rock/metal band
The Quill (album), 1995
Quill, one of many plectra in a harpsichord, made from a feather or synthetic material
The quills, an old word in the United States and Britain for pan pipes

Places
 Lake Quill in New Zealand, source of the Sutherland Falls
 Quill, Georgia, a community in the United States
 Quill City, Malaysia
 Quill Lakes, a wetland complex in Saskatchewan, Canada
 Quill Lake, Saskatchewan, a village northwest of Quill Lakes
 The Quill (volcano), Sint Eustatius, Caribbean Netherlands

Publishing
Quill Award, an American literary award given 2005–2007
Quill Awards, annual journalism awards given by the Melbourne Press Club
The Quill (magazine), Bowdoin College's literary magazine
Quill (comics), several Marvel Comics characters
Quill (magazine), the magazine of the Society of Professional Journalists
The Quill (newspaper), the student newspaper at Brandon University

Other uses
Quill (surname), an Irish surname
Quill Corporation, a retailer based in Lincolnshire, Illinois
Quill Corp. v. North Dakota, a United States Supreme Court case regarding use tax
"Quill" (Grimm), a 2012 episode of the TV series Grimm
Quill (horse), an American Thoroughbred racehorse
Spine (zoology), a needle-like anatomical structure in some animals
Quill (satellite), a reconnaissance satellite programme
Quills (play), a 1995 play by Doug Wright

See also
 Quiller (disambiguation)
 Quilling, an art form
Quillwork, traditional Native American art form
Quillwort, common name of Isoetes